The 2007 Conference USA men's basketball tournament took place March 7–10, 2007, at the FedExForum in Memphis, Tennessee.

Bracket

All games held at FedExForum, Memphis, TN

References

Conference USA men's basketball tournament
Tournament
Conference USA men's basketball tournament
Conference USA men's basketball tournament